That's What Friends Are For is an album by American singers Johnny Mathis and Deniece Williams that was released in July 1978 by Columbia Records. The project was a continuation of the pairing of the artists that began on his previous LP, You Light Up My Life, which included "Too Much, Too Little, Too Late", the duet that was on its way to number one on three different charts in Billboard magazine as the recording sessions for this album got underway.

On July 20, 1978, That's What Friends Are For received Gold certification from the Recording Industry Association of America for sales of 500,000 copies in the United States, and it debuted on Billboards list of America's Top LP's & Tapes shortly thereafter, in the issue dated July 29, for the start of a 16-week chart run that took the album to number 19. That same issue also marked its debut on the magazine's Black Albums chart, where it remained for 11 weeks and peaked at number 14. The following month, on August 28, it made its first of 11 weekly appearances on the UK album chart, during which time it got as high as number 16, and October 31 of that year the British Phonographic Industry awarded the album with Gold certification for sales of 100,000 copies in the UK.

The album was first released on CD in 1997 and reissued on July 1, 2003, with four additional songs by the duo, including a previously unreleased version of "Without Us", the theme from the television series Family Ties.

Singles
Following quickly on the heels of the June 3, 1978, issue of Billboard in which "Too Much, Too Little, Too Late" enjoyed its week at number one on the magazine's Hot 100, this album's opener, a cover of Marvin Gaye and Tammi Terrell's "You're All I Need To Get By", was released on June 15 and had a July 8 debut on the magazine's list of the 100 most popular R&B singles in the US, where it peaked at number 10 over the course of 12 weeks. The July 8 issue also marked its first appearance on the magazine's list of the 50 most popular Easy Listening records in the US, where it spent 11 weeks and got as high as number 16. The July 29 issue included the debut of the song on the Hot 100, where it stayed for eight weeks and reached number 47. The duet also became a new entry on the July 29 UK singles chart, where it made it to number 45 during a six-week run.

The title song from the album (not to be confused with the Bacharach/Sager composition later popularized by Dionne Warwick) was released as a single in the fall of 1978 but did not have any chart appearances.

Reception
Ron Wynn of Allmusic stated retrospectively that Mathis and Williams "made a fine team on this collection of sentimental love songs and light pop ballads."

The review of the album in Billboard concurred, "For the most part this is a set of slick, pretty R&B pop duets, marked by Mathis' best, most uninhibited singing to date, and the equally important participation of Williams."

The magazine's reviews of the singles were also positive. Regarding their cover of the Gaye/Terrell hit, they wrote, "The version here brings fresh spirit to the Ashford & Simpson number within a nicely crafted Jack Gold production." And of "That's What Friends Are For" the review read, "The song has a perky arrangement but it's the Mathis/Williams vocal interplay that shines."

Track listing
Side one
"You're All I Need to Get By" (Nickolas Ashford, Valerie Simpson) – 2:40
"Until You Come Back to Me (That's What I'm Gonna Do)" (Morris Broadnax, Clarence Paul, Stevie Wonder) – 3:39
"You're a Special Part of My Life" (Lani Groves, Clarence McDonald, Deniece Williams) – 2:56
"Ready or Not" (Amber DiLena, Jack Keller) – 2:50
"Me for You, You for Me" (Fritz Baskett, Clarence McDonald) – 3:12

Side two
"Your Precious Love" (Nickolas Ashford, Valerie Simpson) – 3:22
"Just the Way You Are" (Billy Joel) – 3:43
"That's What Friends Are For" (Fritz Baskett, Lani Groves, Clarence McDonald, Deniece Williams) – 3:27
"I Just Can't Get Over You" (Nat Kipner, Winston Sela) – 4:11
"Touching Me With Love" (Marilyn Berglas, Charlee Maass) – 2:30
 The title of this track was replaced on other LP pressings from 1978 and subsequent CD releases with:
"Heaven Must Have Sent You". It is however the same song.

2003 CD bonus tracks
This album's 2003 CD release included four bonus duets:
"Emotion" (Barry Gibb, Robin Gibb) – 3:18
"Too Much, Too Little, Too Late" (Nat Kipner, John Vallins) – 3:00
"Love Won't Let Me Wait" (Vinnie Barrett, Bobby Eli) – 4:16
"Without Us" from Family Ties (Jeff Barry, Tom Scott) – 4:02
As with "Too Much, Too Little, Too Late", "Emotion" was also recorded for the You Light Up My Life album. "Love Won't Let Me Wait" was recorded in 1983 for Mathis's 1984 album A Special Part of Me.

2017 CD bonus tracks
This album's CD release as part of the 2017 box set The Voice of Romance: The Columbia Original Album Collection included three bonus tracks:
"Comme ci, comme ça" (J. S. Stewart) – 2:58
"Without Us" from Family Ties (Barry, Scott) – 4:02
"So Deep in Love" (Barry, Bruce Roberts) – 4:32
"Comme ci, comme ça" and "So Deep in Love" had not been available before. The former was recorded during the sessions for this album, the latter at the same session as the theme song for the series.

Recording dates
From the liner notes for the 2003 CD release:
April 20, 1978 – "You're a Special Part of My Life", "Ready or Not", "Me for You, You for Me", "I Just Can't Get Over You"
April 26, 1978 – "That's What Friends Are For"
April 28, 1978 – "Heaven Must Have Sent You"
May 5, 1978 – "You're All I Need to Get By", "Just the Way You Are", "Touching Me with Love"
May 12, 1978 – "Until You Come Back to Me (That's What I'm Gonna Do)"

Bonus tracks
From the liner notes for The Voice of Romance: The Columbia Original Album Collection:
December 20, 1977 – "Emotion"
December 21, 1977 – "Too Much, Too Little, Too Late"
April 26, 1978 – "Comme ci, comme ça"
October 21, 1982 – "So Deep in Love", "Without Us"
August 16, 1983 – "Love Won't Let Me Wait"

Personnel
Original album
From the liner notes for the original album:

Musicians

Murray Adler – violin
Dorothy Ashby – harp
Michael Baird – drums
Israel Baker – violin
Arnold Belnick – violin
Harry Bluestone – concertmaster
Ronald Cooper – cello
Paulinho da Costa – percussion
Rollice Dale – viola
Douglas Davis – cello
Vincent DeRosa – French horn
Glen Dicterow – violin
Kurt Dieterle – violin
Assa Drori – violin
David Allan Duke – French horn
Scott Edwards – bass
Jesse Ehrlich – cello
Alan Estes – percussion
Henry Ferber – violin
Ronald Folsom – violin
David Frisina – violin
Jim Gilstrap – backing vocals (6, 9)
Endre Granat – violin
Bill Green – flute, baritone saxophone
Ed Greene – drums
Lani Groves – backing vocals (6, 9)
Allan Harshman – viola
John Heitmann – flute
Robert Henderson – French horn
William Hymanson – violin
Plas Johnson – flute, flute solo ("I Just Can't Get Over You")
Armand Kaproff – cello
Dennis Karmazyn – cello
Ray Kelley – cello
Myra Kestenbaum – viola
Jacob Krachmalnick – violin
Raphael Kramer – cello
Ron Leonard – cello
Steve Lukather – guitar
Arthur Maebe – French horn
Virginia Majewski – viola
Leonard Malarsky  – violin
Johnny Mathis – lead and backing vocals
Tim May – guitar
Alexander Neiman – viola
Gareth "Garry" Nuttycombe – viola
Don Palmer – violin
Richard Perissi  – French horn
Greg Phillinganes – keyboards
Stanley Plummer – violin
George Price – French horn
Lee Ritenour – guitar
Sylvester Rivers – keyboards
Nathan Ross – violin
Henry Roth – violin
Michel Rubini – piano
Sheldon Sanov – violin
Harry Schultz – cello
David Schwartz – viola
Gene Sherry – French horn
Jack Shulman – violin
Henry Sigismonti – French horn
Ralph Silverman – violin
Leland Sklar – bass
Marshall Sosson – violin
Sheridon Stokes – flute
Gloria Strassner – cello
Alexander Treger – violin
Tommy Vig – percussion
David T. Walker – guitar
Wah Wah Ragin – guitar
Ernie Watts – tenor saxophone
Maxine Willard Waters – backing vocals (6, 9)
Deniece Williams – lead and backing vocals
Stevie Wonder – harmonica solo ("Just the Way You Are")
Robert Zimmitti – percussion

Production
Jack Gold – producer
Gene Page – arranger, conductor (except where noted)
Glen Spreen – arranger, conductor ("That's What Friends Are For")
Dick Bogert – recording engineer
Joe Gastwirt – digital remastering
Tom Perry – mix engineer at Hollywood Sound Recorders (Hollywood, CA); mastering engineer at The Mastering Lab (Los Angeles, CA).
Sam Emerson – photography

2003 CD reissue
From the liner notes for the 2003 CD release:Bonus tracksJack Gold – producer (except where noted)
Denny Diante – producer ("Love Won't Let Me Wait")
Gene Page – arranger, conductor (except where noted)
Michel Colombier – arranger; conductor ("Love Won't Let Me Wait")Reissue credits'
Didier C. Deutsch – producer
Joseph M. Palmaccio – mastering engineer
Steve Berkowitz – Legacy A&R
Joy Gilbert Monfried – product manager
Darren Salmieri – A&R coordination
Howard Fritzson – art direction
Risa Noah – design
Sam Emerson – photography
Art Maillet/Sony Music Archives – photography
Linda Chang – packaging manager
Stacey Boyle – tape research
Matt Kelly – tape research
Ellis Widner – liner notes
Mastered at Sony Music Studios, New York

Charts

References

Bibliography

 

1978 albums
Johnny Mathis albums
Deniece Williams albums
Vocal duet albums
Columbia Records albums
Albums arranged by Gene Page
Albums recorded at A&M Studios